The 1934 United States Senate election in Texas was held on November 4, 1934. Incumbent Democratic U.S. Senator Tom Connally was re-elected to a second term. Connally fended off a competitive primary challenge from U.S. Representative Joseph Weldon Bailey Jr. on July 28 before facing only nominal opposition in the general election.

The Republican Party, whose support had been devastated by the effects of the Great Depression, did field a candidate (El Paso attorney Ulysses S. Goen) but did not factor in the election.

Democratic primary

Candidates
Joseph Weldon Bailey Jr., U.S. Representative from Gainesville (representing Texas at-large) and son of former U.S. Senator Joseph Weldon Bailey
Tom Connally, incumbent U.S. Senator since 1929
Guy B. Fisher

Results

General election

Results

See also 
 1934 United States Senate elections

References

Texas
1934
Senate